Leo Sarti (born 5 September 1956) is a Sammarinese judoka. He competed in the men's half-lightweight event at the 1988 Summer Olympics.

References

1956 births
Living people
Sammarinese male judoka
Olympic judoka of San Marino
Judoka at the 1988 Summer Olympics
Place of birth missing (living people)